Provincial elections were held in the Netherlands on Wednesday 18 March 2015. Eligible voters elected the members of the States-Provincial in the twelve provinces. These elections also indirectly determined the members of the Senate, since the 566 members of the twelve States-Provincial will elect the Senate's 75 members in the Senate election on 26 May 2015. These provincial election were held on the same day as the 2015 Dutch water boards elections.

Participating parties
Eight political parties participated in the elections in all of the country's twelve provinces:
 Christian Democratic Appeal (CDA)
 Democrats 66 (D66)
 GreenLeft (GL)
 Labour Party (PvdA)
 Party for Freedom (PVV)
 50PLUS
 Socialist Party (SP)
 People's Party for Freedom and Democracy (VVD)

Opinion polls
In the table below the % of voters based on various polls.

Seats summary

Results

National

The table below shows the total number of seats in all provinces. On March 23, the official results of the 2015 election were published. The two parties which lost most seats were PvdA and VVD, the parties in the national government at the time of the election.

By province

Island council elections

References

External links
 

Provincial
2015